Huleechius is a genus of riffle beetles in the family Elmidae. There are at least two described species in Huleechius.

Species
These two species belong to the genus Huleechius:
 Huleechius marroni Brown, 1981
 Huleechius spinipes (Hinton, 1934)

References

Further reading

 
 
 
 
 

Elmidae
Articles created by Qbugbot